TOPS-10 System (Timesharing / Total Operating System-10) is a discontinued operating system from Digital Equipment Corporation (DEC) for the PDP-10 (or DECsystem-10) mainframe computer family. Launched in 1967, TOPS-10 evolved from the earlier "Monitor" software for the PDP-6 and PDP-10 computers; this was renamed to TOPS-10 in 1970.

Overview 
TOPS-10 supported shared memory and allowed the development of one of the first true multiplayer computer games.  The game, called DECWAR, was a text-oriented Star Trek type game.  Users at terminals typed in commands and fought each other in real time. TOPS-10 was also the home of the original Multi User Dungeon, MUD, the fore runner to today's MMORPGs.

Another groundbreaking application was called FORUM. This application was perhaps the first so-called CB Simulator that allowed users to converse with one another in what is now known as a chat room. This application showed the potential of multi-user communication and led to the development of CompuServe's chat application.

TOPS-10 had a very robust application programming interface (API) that used a mechanism called a UUO or Unimplemented User Operation. UUOs implemented operating system calls in a way that made them look like machine instructions. The Monitor Call API was very much ahead of its time, like most of the operating system, and made system programming on DECsystem-10s simple and powerful.

The TOPS-10 scheduler supported prioritized run queues, and appended a process onto a queue depending on its priority. The system also included User file and Device independence.

Commands 
The following list of commands are supported by TOPS-10.

 ASSIGN
 ATTACH
 BACKSPACE
 BACKUP
 CCONTINUE
 COMPILE
 CONTINUE
 COPY
 CORE
 CPUNCH
 CREATE
 CREDIR
 CREF
 CSTART
 D(eposit)
 DAYTIME
 DCORE
 DDT
 DEASSIGN
 DEBUG
 DELETE
 DETACH
 DIRECTORY
 DISABLE
 DISMOUNT
 DSK
 DUMP
 E(xamine)
 EDIT
 ENABLE
 EOF
 EXECUTE
 FILCOM
 FILE
 FINISH
 FUDGE
 GET
 GLOB
 HALT
 HELP
 INITIA
 JCONTINUE
 KJOB
 LABEL
 LIST
 LOAD
 LOCATE
 LOGIN
 MAKE
 MERGE
 MIC
 MOUNT
 NETWORK
 NODE
 NSAVE
 NSSAVE
 OPSER
 PJOB
 PLEASE
 PLOT
 PRESERVE
 PRINT
 PROTECT
 PUNCH
 QUEUE
 QUOLST
 R
 REASSIGN
 REATTACH
 REENTER
 RENAME
 RESOURCES
 REWIND
 RUN
 SAVE
 SSAVE
 SCHED
 SEND
 SET
 SKIP
 START
 SUBMIT
 SYSTAT
 TECO
 TIME
 TPUNCH
 TYPE
 UNLOAD
 USESTAT
 VERSION
 WHERE
 ZERO

History

Release history 
The PDP-6 Monitor software was first released in 1964. Support for the PDP-10's KA10 processor was added to the Monitor in release 2.18 in 1967. The TOPS-10 name was first used in 1970 for release 5.01. Release 6.01 (May 1974) was the first TOPS-10 to implement virtual memory (demand paging), enabling programs larger than physical memory to be run. From release 7.00 onwards, symmetrical multiprocessing was available (as opposed to the master/slave arrangement used before). The final release of TOPS-10 was 7.04 in 1988.

TOPS-10 today 
Hobbyists are now entitled to set up and use TOPS-10 under a Hobbyist's License.

The easiest way for the hobbyist to run TOPS-10 is to acquire a suitable emulator and an operating system image. TOPS-10 may also be generated from archived original distribution "tapes".

Paul Allen maintained several publicly accessible historic computer systems, including a DECsystem-2065 running TOPS-10.

Software

Implemented programming languages 
The TOPS-10 assembler, MACRO-10, was bundled with the TOPS-10 distribution.

The following programming languages were implemented on TOPS-10 as layered products:

 ALGOL, as ALGOL-10 v10B, a compiler used for general computing
 APL, as APL-SF V2, an interpreter used for mathematical modelling
 BASIC, as BASIC-10 v17F, an interpreter used for general computing
 BLISS, as BLISS-10 and BLISS-36, compilers used for systems programming
 COBOL, as COBOL-68 and COBOL-74, compilers used for business computing
 Fortran, as FORTRAN-10 v11, a compiler used for numerical computing

The following programming languages were implemented on TOPS-10 as contributions from DECUS members:

 FOCAL, as FOCAL-10
 Forth, a threaded interpreted language
 IMP72
 Lisp, an interpreter used for AI programming
 Pascal, a compiler used for computing education
 PILOT
 SAM76
 Simula, a compiler used for modeling
 SNOBOL, an interpreter used for string processing
 BCPL, a compiler implemented by Essex University

Implemented user utilities 
The following major user utilities were implemented on TOPS-10:

 RMS (Records Management Services)
 IQL (Interactive Query language)
 DBMS-10 (CODASYL Database Management System)

Notable games implemented on TOPS-10 
 ADVENT
 DECWAR, as noted above
 FORUM, as noted above
 HAUNT, an early role-playing game
 Mac Hack, a chess program by Richard Greenblatt
 MUD

Legacy 
MS-DOS was heavily influenced by TOPS-10. Identical elements include three characters long file extensions, several standard extensions (e.g., EXE, TXT), the asterisk as a wildcard, the usage of the slash as a switch separator and more.

See also 
 PDP-10
 TOPS-20
 WAITS

References 

DEC operating systems
Time-sharing operating systems
1964 software